Waterloo most commonly refers to:
 Battle of Waterloo, an 1815 battle where Napoleon was defeated
 Waterloo, Belgium, location of the battle

Waterloo may also refer to:

Other places

Antarctica
King George Island (South Shetland Islands), known in Russian as Ватерло́о ('Vaterloo')

Australia
Waterloo, New South Wales
Waterloo, Queensland
Waterloo, South Australia
Waterloo Bay, now Elliston, South Australia
Waterloo, Victoria
Waterloo, Western Australia

Canada
Waterloo, Nova Scotia
Regional Municipality of Waterloo, a region in Ontario
Waterloo, Ontario, a city
Waterloo (electoral district)
Waterloo (provincial electoral district)
Waterloo County, Ontario (1853–1973)
Waterloo, Quebec

Hong Kong
Waterloo Road, Hong Kong, a road in Kowloon, Hong Kong

New Zealand
Waterloo, New Zealand

Sierra Leone
Waterloo, Sierra Leone

Suriname
Waterloo, Suriname

United Kingdom
Waterloo, Dorset, England
Waterloo, Huddersfield, England
Waterloo, London, England
Waterloo, Merseyside, England
Waterloo (UK Parliament constituency)
Waterloo, Whixall, Shropshire, England
Waterlooville, known earlier as Waterloo, Hampshire, England
Waterloo, North Lanarkshire, Scotland
Waterloo, Perth and Kinross, Scotland
Waterloo, Caerphilly, Wales
 Waterloo Bay, Northern Ireland

United States

Waterloo, Alabama
Waterloo, California
Waterloo, Georgia
Waterloo, Illinois
Waterloo Historic District, listed on the National Register of Historic Places (NRHP)
Waterloo, Indiana, in DeKalb County
Waterloo, Fayette County, Indiana
Waterloo, Johnson County, Indiana
Waterloo, Iowa
Waterloo, Kansas
Waterloo, Louisiana
Waterloo, Maryland
Waterloo (Princess Anne, Maryland), a historic home 
Waterloo State Recreation Area, in Michigan
Waterloo, Clark County, Missouri, an unincorporated community
Waterloo, Lafayette County, Missouri, an unincorporated community
Waterloo, Montana
Waterloo, Nebraska
Waterloo Historic District (Warner, New Hampshire)
Waterloo, Monmouth County, New Jersey
Waterloo Village, New Jersey
Waterloo (town), New York
Waterloo (village), New York
Waterloo (Albertson, North Carolina), a historic plantation house 
Waterloo, Ohio
Waterloo, Oregon
Waterloo, South Carolina
Waterloo, Texas (former name for Austin, Texas)
Waterloo, Clarke County, Virginia
Waterloo, Culpeper County, Virginia
Waterloo, Fauquier County, Virginia
Waterloo, New Kent County, Virginia
Waterloo, West Virginia
Waterloo, Grant County, Wisconsin, a town
Waterloo, Jefferson County, Wisconsin, a town
Waterloo, Wisconsin, a city within the town
Waterloo Downtown Historic District (Waterloo, Wisconsin)

Arts, entertainment and media

Film and television
Waterloo (1929 film), a German silent film 
Waterloo (1970 film), an epic period war drama
"Waterloo" (Mad Men), an episode of Mad Men

Music
Waterloo & Robinson, an Austrian band
Waterloo Music Company, a Canadian music publishing and musical instrument retailing firm
Waterloo Records, an independent music store in Austin, Texas
Waterloo (album), by ABBA, 1974 
"Waterloo" (ABBA song), Eurovision winner in 1974
"Waterloo" (Stonewall Jackson song), 1959
"Waterloo", a song by IcedEarth from the 2004 album The Glorious Burden

Other uses in arts and entertainment
Waterloo (video game), a 1989 strategic computer game
Waterloo (blog post), a 2010 online commentary by David Frum about the Affordable Care Act
Waterloo: The History of Four Days, Three Armies and Three Battles, a 2014 history book by Bernard Cornwell

Transportation
Waterloo Airport (disambiguation)
Waterloo station (disambiguation)
Waterloo (ship), the name of several ships 
HMS Waterloo, the name of several ships of the Royal Navy

Other uses
Waterloo (horse) (foaled 1969), a British thoroughbred racehorse
Waterloo cheese, a British cheese
Waterloo Cup, an English coursing event 1836–2005
Waterloo F.C., an English rugby union team
Waterloo Gasoline Engine Company, a former American tractor maker
Waterloo Hydrogeologic, a former software and consulting company
University of Waterloo, in Ontario, Canada

See also

Battle of Waterloo (disambiguation)
Waterloo Bridge (disambiguation)
Waterloo Creek (disambiguation)
Waterloo High School (disambiguation)
Waterloo Historic District (disambiguation)
Waterloo Memorial (disambiguation)
Waterloo Road (disambiguation)
Waterloo Square (disambiguation)
"Waterloo Sunset", a 1967 song by The Kinks